Heo is a family name in Korea.

It is also often spelled as Hur or Huh, or less commonly as Her. In South Korea in 1985, out of a population of between roughly 40 and 45 million, there were approximately 264,000 people surnamed Heo. The name is also found in North Korea. The character used for the name (許) means to permit or advocate.

The Heos traditionally trace their ancestry to Queen Heo Hwang-ok, the wife of King Suro of Geumgwan Gaya, one of ancient kingdoms in Korea. She bore ten sons, two of whom retained the Queen's name. The Heos are traditionally considered distant kins of the Kims, who trace their ancestry to the other sons of King Suro.

Clans
As with most other Korean family names, there are many Heo clans, including the Gimhae clan and the Yangchon clan. Each clan consists of individual Heo families. Even within each clan, people in different families are not necessarily related to each other. These distinctions are important, since Korean law used to prohibit intermarriage in the same clan, no matter how remote the relationship; now, however, only those in a relationship of second cousins or closer may not marry. 

As with other Korean family names, the Heo clans are distinguished by the place from which they claim to originate.

Yangcheon Heo clan
Hayang Heo clan
Gimhae Heo clan
Taein Heo clan
Hamchang clan
Suwon clan
Yangju clan

People with the surname
Heo Hwang-ok – Queen of Geumgwan Gaya, clan ancestress
Ben Huh – South Korean-American internet entrepreneur
Heo Jun – b. 1546 Joseon-era court physician
Heo Nanseolheon – b. 1563, Joseon-era painter and poet
Heo Gyun – b. 1569, Joseon-era writer
Heo Im – b. 1570, Joseon-era physician
Heo Jeok – b. 1610, Prime Minister of South Korea during Joseon Dynasty
Heo Jeong – b. 1896, South Korean politician and Korean independence activist
Heo Jang-kang – b. 1925, South Korean actor
Huh Chin-kyu - b. 1940, South Korean businessman, founder and chairman of ILJIN Group
Huh Young-man – b. 1947, South Korean manhwa artist
Huh Kyung-young – b. 1947, South Korean politician, chief of the Democratic Republican Party
Huh Chang-soo – b. 1948, South Korean businessman, chairman of GS Group and FC Seoul
Hur Nam-sik – b. 1949, South Korean politician, 33rd, 34th,and 35th mayor of Busan city
Huh Jung-Moo – b. 1955, South Korean footballer and manager 
Hur Jin-ho – b. 1963, South Korean film director
Young Soon Hue – b. 1963, South Korean ballet choreographer
Heo Joon-ho – b. 1965, South Korean actor
Hur Jae – b. 1965, South Korean basketball coach and former player
Heo Yong-mo – b. 1965, South Korean boxer
Aram Hur – b. 1971, South Korean educator
Heo Hyeon-seok – b. 1971, South Korean dancer and musician (better known as Hyun Jin-young)
Hur Seung-Wook – b. 1972, South Korean alpine skier
Robert K. Hur - b. 1973, Korean-American attorney
Hur Suk-ho – 1973, South Korean golfer
Huh Young-Sook – b. 1975, South Korean handball player 
Huh Soon-Young – b. 1975, South Korean women's handball player
 Heo Sung-tae - b. 1977, South Korean actor
Heo Jae-Won – b. 1984, South Korean football player
Huh Gak – b. 1984, South Korean singer and winner of the second season of Superstar K
Heo Young-ho – b. 1986, South Korean professional Go player
Heo Young-saeng – b. 1986, South Korean singer and member of boy band SS501
Huh E-jae – b. 1987, South Korean actress
Heo Jun  – b. 1988, South Korean foil fencer
M. J. Hur – b. 1989, South Korean golfer
Heo Sol-ji – b. 1989, South Korean singer and member of girl group EXID
Heo Ga-yoon – b. 1990, South Korean singer and member of girl group 4Minute
John Huh – b. 1990, American golfer
Heo Seung — b. 1991, South Korean rapper
Huh Chan-mi – b. 1992, South Korean singer, former member of co-ed group Co-Ed School and girl group F-ve Dolls
Heo Ung – b. 1993, South Korean basketball player
Heo Young-ji – b. 1994, South Korean singer, member of girl group Kara
Heo Hoon – b. 1995, South Korean professional basketball player
Hur Hyun-jun – b. 2000, South Korean singer and actor, former member of boy group The Boyz 
Heo Jung-eun – b. 2007, South Korean actress

See also
List of Korean family names
Korean culture
Xǔ (surname), a Chinese surname written with the same character

References

External links
A 2001 Korea Now article explaining the clan structure
Yangcheon Heo clan website in Korean

Heo clans
Korean-language surnames

vi:Hứa